The  is a 4-laned national expressway in the prefectures of Iwate and Aomori in the Tōhoku region of Japan. It is a spur of the Tōhoku Expressway, primarily serving the city of Hachinohe. Signed as E4A, it is owned and operated by East Nippon Expressway Company.

Route description
The expressway is officially referred to as the Tōhoku Jūkan Expressway Hachinohe Route.

The route connects the city of Hachinohe with the Tōhoku Expressway in Iwate Prefecture. From the terminus at Hachinohe-kita Interchange, there are plans to extend the route northward to the terminus of the Aomori Expressway through a series of toll roads.

History
The Hachinohe Expressway was opened on November 27, 1986, with the Momoishi Extension to the Second Michinoku Toll Road opening later in 1995. After the Great East Japan Earthquake the expressway was made free to use temporarily for those who were impacted by the disaster. Tolls resumed in March 2012.

Future
Starting at the Momoishi Road Extension, the expressway is planned to be extended north and west to connect with the Aomori Expressway and the northern terminus of the Tōhoku Expressway at the Aomori Interchange. This will be done by linking existing roads, such as the Michinoku Toll Road and Daini-Michinoku Toll Road, and the completion of the Kamikita Expressway between them.

Junction list
Distance markers are a continuation of the distance from the southern terminus of the Tōhoku Expressway at Kawaguchi Junction, beginning with 563.3 at Ashiro Junction and increasing as one travels north from there.
SA - service area, PA - parking area

Main Route

Branch route 
This branch is in entirely in Aomori Prefecture.
|colspan="8" style="text-align: center;"|Through to 

|colspan="8" style="text-align: center;"|Through to

Momoishi Road Extension

The Momoishi Toll Road is the first of many extensions of the Hachinohe Expressway that travel northbound towards Aomori. The toll road is a two-lane expressway that is maintained and tolled by the East Nippon Expressway Company; however, drivers continuing north to the Daini-Michinoku Toll Road are tolled by the Aomori Prefecture Road Corporation which does not accept ETC payment, while drivers coming from that toll road to the Momoishi Road can use ETC payment.

See also

References
Explanatory notes

Citations

External links

 East Nippon Expressway Company

Expressways in Japan
Tōhoku Expressway
Roads in Aomori Prefecture
Roads in Iwate Prefecture
1986 establishments in Japan